Satyawan Damle or S. G. Damle, worked as the vice chancellor and director-general at Maharishi Markandeshwar University, Mullana, Haryana, India.

Biography

Damle was born on February 2, 1951. He completed his Bachelor of Dental Surgery (BDS) in 1974 from Nagpur University, Master of Dental Surgery (MDS) in 1982 from Postgraduate Institute of Medical Education and Research, Chandigarh, India, obtained his Ph. D in 2010 from Annamalai University.

Career

Before joining as Vice Chancellor in 2008 at Maharishi Markandeshwar University, he worked as the Joint Municipal Commissioner of Municipal Corporation of Greater Mumbai (2003-2007). He has also worked as the dean, faculty of Dentistry at University of Mumbai, Bombay (1999-2006). He was the Dean of one of the premier dental institutes of the country i.e. Nair Hospital Dental College, Mumbai for 13 years.

He traveled nationally and internationally as Invited Speaker, Keynote Speaker, and Guest Speaker and represented India at various forums and conferences including WHO, FDI, APDC/APDF. He was Chairman of Scientific Committee for 112 World Dental Congress which was held at NCR New Delhi in 2014.

He is the recipient of Fellowship of Royal College of Surgeons and Physicians, Glasgow, Royal College of Surgeons, London, fellowship of royal college of surgeons, Edinburgh. He is also the Fellow of National Academy of Medical Sciences, Fellow of International Academy of Medical Sciences, Fellow of Dental Research, and Fellow of Pierre Fauchard Academy. Prof. Damle conducted numerous inspections of Dental council of India, University Grants Commission. He is also have been a Chairman / Member of Peer Team visits of NAAC (National Assessment and Accreditation Council).

Publications

As far as publications are concerned, he has 151 publications to his credit with 946 citations in Google Scholar, 626 Researchgate citations with 31.56 impact points and 348 Scopus citations.

Books

Books authored by him include the following:

 Text Book(s): Five editions of ‘Textbook of Pediatric Dentistry. The book is recommended by Dental Council of India and most of the Indian Universities for BDS & MDS studies 
 Monograph(s): Manual for Dental Professionals on HIV and AIDS
 Chapters in standard text books/Volume of/Proceedings of Major
 Oral Health in India – A report of the Multi centric Study, Ministry of Health & Family Welfare, Govt. of India & World Health Organization
 Dental Council of India- oral health survey and fluoride mapping

Research papers

Selected research papers include:

 S G Damle, India, Fluoridated dentifrices: towards a cavity free future. International Dental Journal (2009) Vol.59/No.4 (Supplement 1): 237-243.
 Damle S.G, Nadkarni UM. Calcium hydroxide and zinc oxide eugenol as root canal filling materials in primary molars: a comparative study. Australian Endodontic Journal. 2005 Dec; 31 (3): 114-9.
 Satyawan Gangaramji Damle, VikasBengude, Sheeba Saini. Evaluation of Ability of Dentifrices to Remineraliaze Artificial Caries-Like Lesions. Dental Research Journal DRJ Vo.7, No 1 (2010) Page 7-11.
 Damle SG, Doiphode G. A comparison of anticaries and antiplaque efficacy of a fluoridated dentifrice containing 1000 ppm sodium monofluoro phosphate + calcium glycerophosphate and non-fluoridated dentifrice: a one-and-a-half-year clinical trial. [JODDD] Journal of Dental Research, Dental Clinics, Dental Prospects, Page 1-6.
 S.G. Damle, A.K. Jetpurwala, Saini, P. Gupta. Evaluation of Oral Health Status as an Indicator of Disease Progression in HIV Positive Children. Brazilian Research in Pediatric Dentistry & Integrated Clinic Vol 10 No 2 (2010) 151-156.

References

1951 births
Living people
Annamalai University alumni
Indian writers
Rashtrasant Tukadoji Maharaj Nagpur University alumni